Bowmanville High School (also known as BHS) is a public secondary school located in Bowmanville, Ontario, Canada, within the Kawartha Pine Ridge District School Board. The school includes Grades 9 – 12, and offers a French Immersion program.  The principal at Bowmanville High School is Scott Johnson. The current location was established in 1971, and opened to students in September 1972.

History

The original Bowmanville High School was built and opened in 1890. It was located closer to downtown Bowmanville on Queen Street, at the end of Division Street south. In 1929, the high school was expanded upon with a new section. Another section was added in 1954. In 1972, the high school moved to its current location on Liberty Street, leaving the original building empty. In 1974, a fire destroyed much of the school, including the roof and original 1890 section, leaving only the 1920s and 1950s additions standing.

Bowmanville Senior Public School
The former High school building was renovated and re-opened as BSPS in 1975 as an intermediate school for students in Grades 7 and 8. It was open for 32 years until its closure in 2007. In the years after the closure, the school was left boarded-up and abandoned. The building became notorious for vandalism, break-ins and arson, with four fires in 2014 alone. Demolition began in 2015 and by 2016 the property had been cleared out. A seniors retirement residence now resides on the property.

Academics
BHS offers Advanced Placement (AP) and pre-AP courses in Math and English. Students can begin their enrichment program in Grade 9 to receive a more challenging program and, in Grade 12, AP students will have the opportunity to write AP exams.

Feeder schools

The following elementary schools feed directly into Bowmanville High School. 
 Central Public School
 Charles Bowman Public School
 Duke of Cambridge Public School (French Immersion)
 Harold Longworth Public School
 John M. James Public School
 Vincent Massey Public School

See also
List of high schools in Ontario

References

External links
Official Site
KPRDSB Site

High schools in the Regional Municipality of Durham
Buildings and structures in Clarington
Educational institutions established in 1971
1971 establishments in Ontario